Nick Jr. (known on-air as the Nick Jr. Channel) is an American pay television channel spun off from Nickelodeon's long-running programming block of the same name. It is run by Paramount Global through its networks division's Kids and Family Group. The channel launched on September 28, 2009, and primarily targets preschoolers. Its lineup features a mix of originally-produced programming, along with series from the Nickelodeon weekday block; because of the two entities, Nick Jr. is known on-air as "the Nick Jr. Channel" (as of March 2018) to avoid confusion, especially at times of day where both services are carrying preschool programming.

The channel replaced Noggin, which was relaunched as a streaming service in 2015 and acts as a separate sister brand. Noggin's programming is distinct from the Nick Jr. channel's: it mainly carried pre-teen-oriented programs at its launch, and its 2015 streaming service features a variety of exclusive series. From May 2021 to March 2022, the Nick Jr. channel aired an hour-long block of programming from the Noggin app every Friday. The block, titled "Noggin Hour," featured shows such as Noggin Knows and Kinderwood.

The Nick Jr. channel and the Nick Jr. block are both currently running. The latter airs weekdays on Nickelodeon from 7:00 a.m. to 2:00 p.m. ET (those hours vary during the summer months, other school break periods and on major national holidays), having traditional commercial breaks for certain programs. As of September 2018, Nick Jr. is available to approximately 70.310 million pay television households in the United States.

History

Nick Jr. block (1988–present) 

Since its inception in 1977, Nickelodeon's channel space had aired preschool-oriented programs, including Pinwheel, which was their first original series. These were usually played on weekday mornings when older children were in school and younger children were not. This block ran from 8:00 am to 2:00 pm. On January 4, 1988, Nickelodeon debuted a name for its preschool block: Nick Junior. Between September 1988 and mid-1989, the name was shortened to Nick Jr. on-air.

At launch, the block mostly showed imported series purchased from other companies. Eureeka's Castle was the first original series that Nickelodeon made for the block. Brown Johnson, the former vice president of Nick Jr., stated in a 2000 interview that after Eureeka ended production, Nick Jr. became "a neglected daypart" compared to the main Nickelodeon. "Without the investment of energy or money, the block floundered until 1994 when the network poured $30 million into a full-scale relaunch," said Johnson.

On September 5, 1994, the Nick Jr. block began its relaunch and introduced Face, its first host and no longer ran commercial breaks as intermissions during shows. Gullah Gullah Island and Allegra's Window, the second and third original series made for Nick Jr., premiered. They resulted in 50% rating gains for the block. From then onward, Nickelodeon continued to create its own productions for Nick Jr. and foreign-made imports were phased out. Blue's Clues and Dora the Explorer became ratings draws for both the block and Nickelodeon as a whole.

Before gaining its own spin-off network, the Nick Jr. block extended to several other networks: Nick Jr. on CBS from 2000 to 2006, and Nick Jr. on Noggin from 2003 to 2009. The Nick Jr. on CBS block ended on September 9, 2006, when CBS replaced its Nick Jr. programming with KOL Secret Slumber Party. Nick Jr. series continued to appear on Noggin until its closure in 2009, when the Nick Jr. channel replaced it.

Nick Jr. channel (2009–present) 
On February 23, 2009, Nickelodeon announced that Noggin would be replaced by a channel named after the Nick Jr. block. The intention was to bring the channel in line with the Nickelodeon brand identity. In July of that year, Nickelodeon unveiled new standardized logos for its five channels, intending to create a unified look that could better be conveyed across the services.

When the Nick Jr. channel debuted on September 28, 2009, at 6:00 a.m. ET, a new logo was debuted and designed by New York-based creative director/designer Eric Zim. Although the use of an orange "adult" and blue "child" figure was discontinued in the new wordmark logo, the tradition of the "Nick" text being orange (representing the adult) and the "Jr." text remaining in blue (as the child) was retained. Until 2012, the Nick Jr. channel retained Noggin's on-air branding style and played several of its programs, most notably the mascots Moose and Zee. It also continued not to accept traditional advertising or marginalize closing credits for promotion of other shows on the channel.

On March 1, 2012, the Nick Jr. channel received a new rebrand produced by Gretel Inc. Jessica DiCicco became the network's announcer, and the Moose and Zee mascots were completely dropped after nine years, removing one of the last vestiges of Noggin; as a result, some of the interstitial learning activities that originally featured Moose's narration (like the Puzzle Time segments) were recycled and replaced by her narration. The channel's slogan changed from "It's Like Preschool On TV" to "The Smart Place To Play" (which was also used as the branding for the Nick Jr. block), while several shows — The Upside Down Show, Oswald, Jack's Big Music Show, Franklin, Toot & Puddle and Miss Spider's Sunny Patch Friends — were pulled from the lineup; most of them would return later that year, while the former could still be seen on the channel's website at the time.

At this point, programming began to be hosted by characters from Nick Jr. shows. The Nick Jr. channel also began incorporating programming promotions and short features on that date; seven months later, on October 1, 2012, it started airing limited traditional advertising (for companies such as ABCMouse, Kmart, Chuck E. Cheese's, Nabi, Clorox, Walmart, Lysol and Playskool) in the form of underwriter sponsorships airing in-between shows, whereas its parent network airs longer traditional advertising.

On May 21, 2018, the channel refreshed their imaging with new interstitial pieces and updated curriculum notices, and began to promote themselves as the "Nick Jr. Channel" audibly and visually to avoid confusion with the Nickelodeon block.

NickMom block (2012–2015) 

From October 1, 2012, to September 28, 2015, a four-hour block of parent-targeted shows called NickMom aired from 10:00 p.m. to 2:00 a.m. ET. The NickMom name started out with a humor website in 2011 and the four-hour time slot aired comedies like Instant Mom and NickMom Night Out.

On September 9, 2015, the social media channels of NickMom announced that the four-hour weeknight block on the Nick Jr. channel, along with the NickMom website, would end operations by the end of September 28, 2015, due to Viacom's 2015 cutbacks involving acquired programming and also due to NickMom's low ratings with the time vacated by NickMom returned to traditional Nick Jr. programming like Dora the Explorer, Blue's Clues, Team Umizoomi, and Bubble Guppies. In the early morning of September 28, 2015, NickMom ended its 3-year run at 2:00 a.m. ET, with an airing of the film Guarding Tess. No sign off message was shown; after the film Guarding Tess, it faded straight into an episode of Yo Gabba Gabba! at its end. NickMom's former website address is now used as a redirect to Nickelodeon's site for parental resources.

Following NickMom's closure, the Nick Jr. channel increased the amount of traditional advertising it aired, but also began scheduling programs in an inversion of the "off-the-clock" format where the network shortened some of its commercial breaks, allowing the network to air more programming. The "off-the-clock" format was previously adopted by various Viacom networks, such as TV Land, Nick at Nite and Comedy Central (though in a reversed form, the scheduling format for those channels was designed to add extra advertising loads).

Noggin Hour block (2021–2022) 
On May 28, 2021, the Nick Jr. channel introduced an hour-long block of programming from the Noggin app every Friday. The block was usually titled "Noggin Hour" and was retitled "Noggin Presents" on days when it ran longer than an hour. Series featured in the timeslot included the Noggin originals Kinderwood and Noggin Knows, as well as the acquired shows Hey Duggee and JoJo & Gran Gran. Noggin interstitials played during commercial breaks, and a purple screen bug reading "On Noggin" was shown toward the beginning of each show.

Programming 

The Nick Jr. channel schedule mainly features reruns from Nickelodeon's library of preschool programming, along with a few original series exclusive to the channel. As of 2022, the channel's lineup includes The Adventures of Paddington, Baby Shark's Big Show!, Blaze and the Monster Machines, Blue's Clues & You!, Bubble Guppies, Face's Music Party, Hey Duggee,  Kiri & Lou, PAW Patrol, Peppa Pig, Ryan's Mystery Playdate, Santiago of the Seas, and Team Umizoomi.

Related services

International 
On May 16, 2011, MTV Networks launched two new channels, Nick Jr. and MTVNHD, in Asia. These 24-hour channels began to be available on StarHub TV in Singapore on May 18, 2011, and on Telekom Malaysia Berhad's Unifi TV in Malaysia on June 1, 2011. The channel launched aggressively to the rest of Southeast Asia later.

An African version of Nick Jr. was launched on September 30, 2014, along with Nicktoons. In Poland, Nick Jr. is available on Platforma Canal+ since March 2013. In Romania, Nick Jr. is available on UPC Romania since October 24, 2014. In Canada, Nick Jr. was launched as a programming block on the local version of Nickelodeon.

Versions of Nick Jr. also exist in the United Kingdom and Ireland, Germany, The Netherlands & Flanders, India, France, Italy, Latin America, and Australia. On November 3, 2017, Nick Jr. launched in Portugal.

Nick Jr. is also available in Japan in the form of a programming block on the Japanese version of Nickelodeon.

International versions of the TV channel include:
 Nick Jr. (UK and Ireland) – Introduced in 1993
 Nick Jr. Too/Nick Jr. 2
 Nick Jr. (Germany) – Introduced in 1995
 Nick Jr. (Latin America) – Introduced in 1997
 Nick Jr. (Australia and New Zealand) – Introduced in 1998
 Nick Jr. (Turkey) – Introduced in 1998
 Nick Jr. (Israel) – Introduced in 2003
 Nick Jr. (The Netherlands) – Introduced in 2003
 Nickelodeon Junior (France) – Introduced in 2005
 Nick Jr. (Middle East and North Africa) – Introduced in 2008
 Nick Jr. (Italy) – Introduced in 2009
 Nick Jr. (Canada) – Introduced in 2009 (as a programming block)
 Nick Jr. (Scandinavia) – Introduced in 2010
 Nick Jr. (Greece) – Introduced in 2010
 Nick Jr. (Southeast Asia) – Introduced in 2010
 Nick Jr. (Russia and CIS) – Introduced in 2011
 Nick Jr. (India) – Introduced in 2012
 Nick Jr. (Sub-Saharan Africa) – Introduced in 2014
 Nick Jr. (Portugal) – Introduced in 2017

See also 
 Nick Jr. (TV programming block)

References

External links 

  (United States)
  (United Kingdom)
  (Canada)
  (Australia)
International websites
  (Latin America) (in Spanish)
  (Brazil) (in Portuguese)
  (Spain) (in Spanish)
  (France) (in French)
  (Germany) (in German)
  (Italy) (in Italian)
  (Poland) (in Polish)
  (Netherlands) (in Dutch)

 
Preschool education television networks
Television networks in the United States
Television channels and stations established in 2009
Nickelodeon
English-language television stations in the United States
Children's television networks in the United States
2009 establishments in the United States